Adrian A Husain (born Syed Akbar Husain) is a Pakistani poet, Shakespearean scholar, and literary journalist. He was also founder Chairman of the civil rights think tank Dialogue: Pakistan prior to the return of democracy in 2008.

Life 
Educated in England, Italy and Switzerland, he received his BA Hons. degree in English literature from the University of Oxford in 1963.

He won the Guinness Poetry Prize (1st) for a poem titled 'House at Sea' in 1968.

He received a PhD from the University of East Anglia for a thesis on Shakespeare, Machiavelli and Castiglione in 1993.

Work 
He is the author of Politics and Genre in Hamlet, published by Oxford University Press in 2004. His collection of verse, Desert Album, was published as part of the Golden Jubilee Series in 1997 by Oxford University Press to coincide with Pakistan’s Golden Jubilee in 1997. He also published an acclaimed collection of sonnets, Italian Window in 2017.

A recent publication, The Changing World of Contemporary South Asian Poetry in English: A Collection of Critical Essays, Mitali P. Wong (ed.) and M. Yousuf Saeed (ed.), contains an essay on Husain’s verse. When Adrian A Husain wrote his Elegy for Benazir Bhutto in 2011, the late Pakistani writer Khalid Hasan described him as the finest living poet writing in English. He has said that he aspires to write verse that transcends time and space, rather than specifically Pakistani ethnic poetry.

References

Living people
People from Kanpur
English-language poets from Pakistan
20th-century Pakistani poets
 Poets
Poets
Pakistani male poets
20th-century male writers
Year of birth missing (living people)